Among religions in Brunei, Sunni Islam is predominant. In 2016, it was estimated that 80.9% of Brunei's population is Muslim. However, other religions also have a considerable foothold in Brunei: 7% of the population is Christian and another 7% is Buddhist. The remaining 5% subscribe to various religions, including indigenous religions.

Islam is the state religion of Brunei, but freedom of religion is guaranteed. This freedom however, limited for several cases. The right to practice privately is given to a plethora of religions. Furthermore, some non-Islamic holidays, such as Lunar New Year, Christmas, Vesak day and Gawai Dayak, are recognised. These rights however, are limited: religious education is controlled, even in the Chinese, Christian and private schools, and any non-Islamic religious materials being distributed are gazetted as illegal and tightly forbidden; where if caught it will result in an immediate death punishment without judgment and the involved materials are subject to confiscation, based on the 2014 Shariah Penal Code Ordinance.

The state madh'hab of Islam is the Shafi'i school of jurisprudence of Sunni Islam. Most of Brunei's Muslim population subscribe to the Shafi'i school as well, and Shafi'i is a major source of law for the country. However, with the Sultan's permission, lawmakers may also consult the other three Sunni schools of fiqh.

In Brunei, non-Muslims must be at least 14 years and 7 months old if they want to convert to another religion. A minor will automatically become a Muslim if his parents convert to Islam.

See also 

 Hinduism in Brunei
 Christianity in Brunei
 Buddhism in Brunei
 Islam in Brunei
 Freedom of religion in Brunei

References 

 
Brunei